The UK Rock & Metal Albums Chart is a record chart that ranks the best-selling rock and heavy metal albums in the United Kingdom. Compiled and published by the Official Charts Company, the data is based on each album's weekly physical sales, digital downloads and streams. In 2003, there were 17 albums that topped the 52 published charts. The first number-one album of the year was By the Way, the eighth studio album by Red Hot Chili Peppers, which remained at Number One for the first three weeks of the year at the end of a nine-week run which began on 23 November 2002. The final Number One album of the year was Permission to Land, the debut studio album by The Darkness, which spent the last four weeks of the year (and the first week of 2004) at Number One in its fourth spell of the year, at the top of the chart.

The most successful album on the UK Rock & Metal Albums Chart in 2003 was Permission to Land, which spent a total of 18 weeks at Number One over five spells, including a run of eight consecutive weeks between the week ending 9 August and the week ending 27 September. Permission to Land was the best-selling rock and metal album of the year, ranking sixth in the UK End of Year Albums Chart. By the Way spent nine weeks at Number One in 2003, and was the 18th best-selling album of the year. Evanescence's debut studio album Fallen was Number One on the chart for five weeks in 2003, Linkin Park's second studio album Meteora spent four weeks at number one, and three albums – One by One by Foo Fighters, Radiohead's Hail to the Thief and Room on Fire by The Strokes – were Number One for two weeks each during 2003.

Chart history

See also
 2003 in British music
 List of UK Rock & Metal Singles Chart number ones of 2003

References

External links
 Official UK Rock & Metal Albums Chart Top 40 at the Official Charts Company
 The Official UK Top 40 Rock Albums at BBC Radio 1

2003 in British music
United Kingdom Rock and Metal Albums
2003